Davide Bove (born 7 November 1998) is an Italian professional footballer who plays as a centre back for  club Crotone.

Career
Born in Benevento, Bove started his career in Novara youth sector. He was promoted to the first team at 2018–19 Serie C season. He made his professional debut on 28 November against Pontedera.

In July 2019, he left football by heart problems. On 28 October 2019, Bove returned as a player.

On 21 August 2021, he signed with Avellino.

On 1 August 2022, Bove moved to Crotone on a two-year contract.

References

External links
 
 

1998 births
Living people
Sportspeople from Benevento
Footballers from Campania
Italian footballers
Association football central defenders
Serie C players
Novara F.C. players
U.S. Avellino 1912 players
F.C. Crotone players